Benton County is a county within the Northwest Arkansas region with a culture, economy, and history that have transitioned from rural and agricultural to suburban and white collar since the growth of Walmart, which is headquartered in Benton County. Created as Arkansas's 35th county on September 30, 1836, Benton County contains thirteen incorporated municipalities, including Bentonville, the county seat, and Rogers, the most populous city. The county was named after Thomas Hart Benton, a U.S. Senator from Missouri influential in Arkansas statehood.

The county is located within the gently rolling terrain of the Springfield Plateau, a subset of the Ozark Mountains. Much of eastern Benton County is located along Beaver Lake, a reservoir of the White River. The county contains three protected areas: Logan Cave National Wildlife Refuge, Pea Ridge National Military Park, and Devil's Eyebrow Natural Area, as well as parts of the Ozark National Forest, Hobbs State Park – Conservation Area, and two state wildlife management areas.  Other historical features such as log cabins, one-room school houses, community centers, and museums describe the history and culture of Benton County.

Benton County occupies  and contained a population of 284,333 people in 100,749 households as of the 2020 Census, ranking it tenth in size and second in population among the state's 75 counties. The economy is heavily influenced by the presence of Walmart and the hundreds of associated businesses, with agriculture, tourism, and construction also important sectors. Benton County has the highest median household income in the state, slightly above the national median.

History
Benton County was created from Washington County by the 1st Arkansas General Assembly on September 30, 1836. Created shortly after statehood, it was named for Thomas Hart Benton, a U.S. Senator from Missouri influential in Arkansas's statehood. Early white settlements were established at Maysville and Cross Hollow, but a new centrally located community was laid out, named Bentonville, and designated as county seat.

Geography
Most of the water is in Beaver Lake.

Adjacent counties
Barry County, Missouri (north)
Carroll County (east)
Madison County (southeast)
Washington County (south)
Adair County, Oklahoma (southwest)
Delaware County, Oklahoma (west)
McDonald County, Missouri (northwest)

National protected areas
 Logan Cave National Wildlife Refuge
 Ozark National Forest (part)
 Pea Ridge National Military Park

State protected areas
 Beaver Lake Wildlife Management Area
 Hobbs State Park - Conservation Area
 Wedington WMA

Demographics

2000 census
As of the 2000 United States Census, there were 153,406 people, 58,212 households, and 43,484 families residing in the county. There were 64,281 housing units at an average density of 76 per square mile (29/km2). The racial makeup of the county was 90.87% White, 0.41% Black or African American, 1.65% Native American, 1.09% Asian, 0.08% Pacific Islander, 4.08% from other races, and 1.82% from two or more races. 8.78% of the population were Hispanic or Latino of any race.

As of 2005 estimates, Benton County's population was 81.7% non-Hispanic white, while the percentage of Latinos grew by 60 percent in the time period. 1.1% of the population was African-American; 1.6% was Native American (the historical presence of the Cherokee Indians live in close proximity to Oklahoma); 1.7% was Asian (there was a large influx of Filipinos, Vietnamese and South Asian immigrants in recent decades) and 0.2% of the population was Pacific Islander. 1.6% reported two or more races, usually not black-white due to a minuscule African-American population. 12.8% was Latino, but the United States Hispanic Chamber of Commerce believed the official estimate is underreported and Latinos could well be 20 percent of the population.

There were 58,212 households, out of which 34.40% had children under the age of 18 living with them, 63.00% were married couples living together, 8.20% had a female householder with no husband present, and 25.30% were non-families. 21.10% of all households were made up of individuals, and 8.50% had someone living alone who was 65 years of age or older. The average household size was 2.60 and the average family size was 3.01.

In the county, the population was spread out, with 26.60% under the age of 18, 8.60% from 18 to 24, 29.40% from 25 to 44, 21.10% from 45 to 64, and 14.30% who were 65 years of age or older. The median age was 35 years. For every 100 females, there were 97.40 males. For every 100 females age 18 and over, there were 94.90 males.

The median income for a household in the county was $40,281, and the median income for a family was $45,235. Males had a median income of $30,327 versus $22,469 for females. The per capita income for the county was $19,377. About 7.30% of families and 10.10% of the population were below the poverty line, including 13.80% of those under age 18 and 7.30% of those age 65 or over.

2010 census
As of the 2010 census, the county population was 221,339. The racial makeup of the county was 76.18% Non-Hispanic white, 1.27% Black or African American, 1.69% Native American, 2.85% Asian, 0.30% Pacific Islander. 15.49% of the population was Hispanic or Latino.

2020 census

As of the 2020 United States census, there were 284,333 people, 100,749 households, and 72,399 families residing in the county.

Culture
In 2012, Benton County voters elected to make the county wet, or a non-alcohol prohibition location.

Economy
Walmart corporate headquarters is located in Bentonville.
Daisy Outdoor Products, known for its air rifles, is headquartered in Rogers.
JB Hunt Transport Services corporate headquarters is located in Lowell.
Tyson Foods, based in Springdale, has a distribution center located in Rogers.
Simmons Foods, a major supplier of poultry, pet, and animal nutrition products is based in Siloam Springs.
America’s Car-Mart, one of the largest American publicly held automotive retailers, is based in Rogers.

Transportation

Major highways

 Interstate 49
 U.S. Highway 62
 U.S. Highway 71
 U.S. Highway 412
 Highway 12
 Highway 16
 Highway 43
 Highway 59
 Highway 72
 Highway 94
 Highway 102
 Highway 112
 Highway 127
 Highway 244
 Highway 264
 Highway 265
 Highway 279
 Highway 303
 Highway 340
 Highway 549
 Highway 612

The historic Trail of Tears is on US highways 62 and 71 and connects with U.S. Route 412 in nearby Washington County.

Airports
 Northwest Arkansas National Airport (XNA) is located near Highfill.
 Rogers Municipal Airport (ROG) serves the county and surrounding communities.

Rail
The Arkansas and Missouri Railroad parallels US Highways 62 and 71 in the county.

Politics
Like all of the conservative Bible Belt of the Ozarks and Ouachitas, Benton County is strongly Republican; however, it has been such for longer than most of the region. It voted Republican in 1928 and 1944, and the last Democratic presidential nominee to carry the county was Harry S. Truman in 1948. Along with nearby Sebastian County it was one of the few counties in Arkansas to resist the appeal of southern “favorite sons” Lyndon B. Johnson, George Wallace, Jimmy Carter, and Arkansas governor Bill Clinton.
 

In Benton County, voters have supported the GOP in the last eighteen presidential elections.

Communities

Cities

Bella Vista
Bentonville (county seat)
Cave Springs
Centerton
Decatur
Elm Springs (mostly in Washington County)
Gentry
Gravette
Little Flock
Lowell
Pea Ridge
Rogers
Siloam Springs
Springdale (mostly in Washington County)
Sulphur Springs

Towns
Avoca
Garfield
Gateway
Highfill
Springtown

Census-designated places
 Cherokee City
 Hiwasse (former CDP)
 Lost Bridge Village
 Maysville
 Prairie Creek

Townships

Note: Most Arkansas counties have names for their townships. Benton County, however, has numbers instead of names.

Education
School districts include:

 Bentonville Public Schools
 Decatur School District
 Gentry Public Schools
 Gravette School District
 Pea Ridge School District
 Rogers Public Schools
 Siloam Springs Schools
 Springdale School District

See also
 List of lakes in Benton County, Arkansas
 National Register of Historic Places listings in Benton County, Arkansas

Notes

References

External links
Official Website of Benton County, Arkansas
Benton County Code of Ordinances
County Records Online

 
Northwest Arkansas
1836 establishments in Arkansas
Populated places established in 1836